Leslie Cunningham may refer to:
 L. B. C. Cunningham, Scottish scientist
 Les Cunningham, Canadian ice hockey player